Olufunmilola Aduke Iyanda (born 27 July 1971), better known as Funmi Iyanda, is a talk show host, broadcaster, Film and TV producer, media executive, philanthropist, journalist, and blogger.<ref>"Sharing a dawn with Funmi", The Guardian Life, 26 October 2009.</ref> She produced and hosted a talk show, New Dawn with Funmi, which aired on the national network for over eight years. Iyanda rose to become one of Nigeria’s most watched TV personalities 3 . Funmi is the CEO of Ignite Media now OYA Media. In 2011, Iyanda was honored for her web series by the World Economic Forum and was named one of Forbes "20 Youngest Powerful Women in Africa".

 Early life 
Funmi Iyanda was born in Lagos to the family of Gabriel and Yetunde Iyanda. Her father was from Ogbomoso and her mother from Ijebu-Ode. She grew up in the Lagos Mainland area; however, her mother died when she was seven years old. She attended the African Church Princess Primary School, Akoka; and the Herbert Macaulay School in Lagos, Nigeria, for her primary education and the International School Ibadan for her secondary education. She then went on to the University of Ibadan where she graduated with a Bachelor of Science degree in Geography.

 Good Morning Nigeria and Sports Journalism 
Funmi's foray into television began when she started producing and presenting Good Morning Nigeria, a breakfast magazine television show. The "Heroes" segment, which exalted the achievement of deserving members of society, and "Street Life", which unlike many shows at the time, went out on the streets in search of compelling Nigerian human-interest stories.

The show focused on the injustices suffered by Nigerians, particularly the vulnerable members such as women and children. The show was syndicated on national television.

The first show she anchored was called MITV Live, produced by Segun Odegbami and Tunde Kelani. She also explored her deep passion for sports by entering the world of sports journalism. She worked on a documentary for the 2006 Africa Cup of Nations and she covered the 1999 female Football World Cup, the All Africa Games in Zimbabwe, as well as the 2000 and 2004 Olympic Games in Sydney and Athens.

 New Dawn with Funmi New Dawn with Funmi started in 2000 and ran daily on NTA 10 Lagos. The success of the show made it the longest-running independently produced show on NTA.

Funmi Iyanda has also written regular columns in Tempo Magazine. On occasion, she still serves as a guest columnist for Farafina Magazine. She has also written for PM NEWS, The Punch, Daily Trust, and Vanguard Newspapers.

 Talk With Funmi 
In 2010, after a two-year break, Funmi returned to the screen with Talk with Funmi (TWF), a television show directed by Chris Dada. Talk With Funmi travels throughout Nigeria, from state to state, capturing people and conversations around the country.

 My Country: Nigeria 
In 2010 Funmi Iyanda completed production on My Country: Nigeria, a three-part documentary celebrating the 50th anniversary of the country’s independence, which was aired on the BBC World Service. Lagos Stories'', one of the episodes of the documentary was subsequently nominated in the category for “Best News Documentary” at the 2011 Monte Carlo Television Festival in Monaco.

Chopcassava 
In 2012, Funmi Iyanda and her creative partner Chris Dada released Chopcassava.com, a web series documenting the January 2012 fuel subsidy protests that took place in Lagos, Nigeria. It could not be aired on Nigerian TV, the web series presents an insider view of the Lagos protests, in which people of all classes took to the streets demanding a reversal of the 117% hike in petrol prices. It was nominated in the non-fiction web series category at the 2012 BANFF World Media Festival, in Alberta, Canada.

Personal life 
Funmi Iyanda is a member of the African Leadership Institute, Tutu Fellow, and a participant of the ASPEN Institute's Forum for Communications and Society.

In 2012 she was honoured by the Lagos State Governor, Babatunde Raji Fashola, for her commitment to gender advocacy as she returned from a five-day UN advocacy trek up Mount Kilimanjaro. The climb was organised by the UN to raise global awareness on its campaign to End Violence against Women and Girls and brought together climbers from more than 32 African countries in a historic advocacy journey up Mount Kilimanjaro.

Funmi Iyanda served on the Board of Farafina Trust and Positive Impact Youth Network. She participated at the Occupy Nigeria series of protests in January 2012. The protests were to resist the implementation of the government's fuel subsidy removal policy.

Funmi Iyanda was honored by the former governor of Lagos State, Babatunde Fashola, for partnering with the United Nations(UN) together with other African women by climbing up the mount Kilimanjaro as a way of creating awareness for the campaign to end violence against women and the girl child in Africa.

Recognition
She was recognized as one of the BBC's 100 women of 2014.

References

Further reading

External links
Funmi Iyanda blog

1971 births
Living people
Yoruba women television personalities
Nigerian broadcasters
Nigerian television personalities
International School, Ibadan alumni
University of Ibadan alumni
Nigerian television talk show hosts
Writers from Lagos
Nigerian bloggers
BBC 100 Women
Nigerian women bloggers
Television personalities from Lagos
21st-century Nigerian women writers
Nigerian women journalists
Nigerian women business executives
Women chief executives
21st-century Nigerian writers
Yoruba women in business